Nayan Dilip Doshi (born 6 October 1978, Nottingham) is an English cricketer, who was released by Derbyshire. He is the son of Dilip Doshi, who is a former Indian Test bowler. Doshi, a left arm spin bowler, first played for Surrey in June 2004, after already playing for the Indian side Saurashtra in the Ranji Trophy.

At the end of the 2006 cricket season, Doshi signed a two-year contract with Surrey, which was to end after the 2008 season. On 19 July 2007, Surrey announced that this contract had been terminated at Doshi's request.

Doshi then signed a short-term deal with Warwickshire until the end of the 2007 season. Doshi was due to make his debut in Warwickshire's County Championship match against Sussex on 8 August that year. However, he was unable to do so owing to confusion surrounding the registration process.

Doshi was the first bowler in the Twenty20 Cup to take a hat-trick and still finish on the losing side. Nayan Doshi became the oldest player in IPL auction 2021 after Pravin Tambe who was the oldest at the IPL auction 2020.

References

External links
Cricinfo page on Nayan Doshi

1978 births
Living people
English cricketers
Saurashtra cricketers
Surrey cricketers
Buckinghamshire cricketers
Derbyshire cricketers
Cricketers from Nottingham
Royal Challengers Bangalore cricketers
Rajasthan Royals cricketers
English people of Indian descent